Đặng Ngọc Tuấn (born 6 May 1995) is a Vietnamese footballer who plays as a goalkeeper for V.League 1 club  Hồ Chí Minh City

M-150 Cup
Ngọc Tuấn was included in Vietnam U23 squad for the M-150 Cup at Thailand

Honours
Vietnam U23 
AFC U-23 Championship Runners-up  2018

References

Vietnamese footballers
People from An Giang Province
1995 births
Living people
Association football goalkeepers
SHB Da Nang FC players
An Giang FC players